Volvulina is a genus of colonial green algae in the family Volvocaceae. The colony (coenobium) is broadly ellipsoidal or spherical and consists of a fixed number of cells, usually 16 in mature individuals (rarely 4, 8 or 32).  The cells are located at periphery of the coenobium and separated from each other by being embedded in a swollen sack. The cell body is lens-shaped or half spherical when mature with two flagella.  The chloroplast is dish- or bowl-shaped. Pyrenoids may be present or absent, the stigma large.  The nucleus is centrally located and there may be 4 to 8 contractile vacuoles.  Sexual reproduction is by isogamy.

References

External links
 Volvulina - Description with pictures

Chlamydomonadales genera
Chlamydomonadales